Głębowice may refer to the following places in Poland:
Głębowice, Lower Silesian Voivodeship (south-west Poland)
Głębowice, Lesser Poland Voivodeship (south Poland)